Honken Trophy is awarded annually to the Swedish goaltender of the year, playing in Sweden (usually in the SHL), as decided on by Eventhouse and Kamratföreningen Hockeyjournalisterna. It was installed in 2002 and resembles the Vezina Trophy of the NHL. The trophy is named in honour of goalie Leif "Honken" Holmqvist.

Winners

References

External links 
Kamratföreningen Hockeyjournalisterna

Awards established in 2002
Swedish ice hockey trophies and awards
Swedish Hockey League
2002 establishments in Sweden